Ransey Guy Cole Jr. (born May 23, 1951) is a Senior United States circuit judge of the United States Court of Appeals for the Sixth Circuit.

Early life and education 

Cole was born in Birmingham, Alabama and attended Cheshire Academy in Connecticut. He earned a Bachelor of Arts degree from Tufts University in 1972 and a Juris Doctor from Yale Law School in 1975.

Professional career 

Cole worked as an associate in private practice with the law firm Vorys, Sater, Seymour and Pease in Columbus, Ohio from 1975 until 1978. Upon joining the firm in 1975, he was just the second African-American at the firm, and in 1983, he became its first African-American partner. He joined the United States Department of Justice and worked as a trial attorney in the commercial litigation branch of the United States Department of Justice Civil Division from 1978 until 1980. He then transitioned back into private practice at Vorys Sater in Columbus, Ohio from 1980 until 1986. Cole became a United States Bankruptcy Judge for the Southern District of Ohio from 1987 until 1993. He returned to private practice in Columbus at Vorys Sater from 1993 until becoming an appeals court judge in 1995.

Federal judicial service 

President Bill Clinton nominated Cole to a seat on the United States Court of Appeals for the Sixth Circuit on June 29, 1995, to replace Judge Nathaniel R. Jones, who assumed senior status on May 13, 1995. Although Republicans controlled the United States Senate at that time, Cole's nomination was considered uncontroversial. The Senate Judiciary Committee unanimously recommended Cole's confirmation on October 26, 1995. The Senate unanimously confirmed Cole by a voice vote on December 22, 1995. He received his commission on December 26, 1995. Cole served as Chief Judge from August 15, 2014, to May 1, 2021. On December 10, 2021, he announced his intent to assume senior status upon confirmation of a successor. He assumed senior status on January 9, 2023.

Notable cases 

On January 5, 2022, Cole partially dissented in a 2-1 decision that upheld an injunction against an executive order requiring federal contractors to ensure that their workers get the COVID-19 vaccine.

See also 
 List of African-American federal judges
 List of African-American jurists

References

External links 
 
 

1951 births
Living people
20th-century American judges
21st-century American judges
African-American judges
Cheshire Academy alumni
Judges of the United States Court of Appeals for the Sixth Circuit
Lawyers from Birmingham, Alabama
Tufts University alumni
United States court of appeals judges appointed by Bill Clinton
Yale Law School alumni
Judges of the United States bankruptcy courts